Michelle Fisher (born 1997) is a South African chess player who holds the title of Woman FIDE Master (WFM, 2017).

Career
Fisher earned the title of Woman FIDE Master in 2017.
She has represented South Africa in the Women's Chess Olympiad of 2014, 2016 and 2018 on board five, four and three respectively.

References

External links
 

Michelle Fisher chess games at 365Chess.com

South African female chess players
Chess Olympiad competitors
Living people
1997 births
Chess Woman FIDE Masters
20th-century South African women
21st-century South African women